Oscar Palma (born 7 October 1955) is a Colombian weightlifter. He competed in the men's featherweight event at the 1984 Summer Olympics.

References

External links
 

1955 births
Living people
Colombian male weightlifters
Olympic weightlifters of Colombia
Weightlifters at the 1984 Summer Olympics
Place of birth missing (living people)
20th-century Colombian people
21st-century Colombian people